Åke Fridolf Söderblom (20 January 1910 – 22 May 1965) was a Swedish actor, screenwriter and songwriter (one of his songs is Kan du vissla Johanna?). He appeared in 70 films between 1933 and 1965.

Selected filmography

 The Dangerous Game (1933)
 Two Men and a Widow (1933)
 Eva Goes Aboard (1934)
 It Pays to Advertise (1936)
 Unfriendly Relations (1936)
 Russian Flu (1937)
 Klart till drabbning (1937)
 Oh, Such a Night! (1937)
 Thunder and Lightning (1938)
 Julia jubilerar (1938)
 Nothing But the Truth (1939)
 Kiss Her! (1940)
 The Crazy Family (1940)
 Fröken Vildkatt (1941)
 We're All Errand Boys (1941)
 Poor Ferdinand (1941)
 The Ghost Reporter (1941)
 Tonight or Never (1941)
 Löjtnantshjärtan (1942)
 Little Napoleon (1943)
 Lilla helgonet (1944)
 His Majesty Must Wait (1945)
 Flottans kavaljerer (1948)
 Vi flyr på Rio (1949)
 The Swedish Horseman (1949)
 The Motor Cavaliers (1950)
 Knockout at the Breakfast Club (1950)
 Sköna Helena (1951) 
 Beef and the Banana (1951)
 My Friend Oscar (1951)
 Blondie, Beef and the Banana (1952)
 Flicka i kasern (1955)
 The Koster Waltz (1958)
 Sailors (1964)
 Här kommer bärsärkarna (1965)

External links

1910 births
1965 deaths
People from Mark Municipality
Swedish male film actors
Swedish male screenwriters
Swedish songwriters
20th-century Swedish male actors
20th-century Swedish screenwriters
20th-century Swedish male writers